Phi Kappa National Fraternity is a secondary school social fraternity. Since its founding in the early twentieth century, Phi Kappa has chartered nearly fifty chapters across the Deep South, from Georgia to Texas, Arkansas to Florida. No chapters of the fraternity have ever been chartered outside of the old Confederacy, making Phi Kappa the oldest and largest exclusively Southern Greek-letter social fraternity.

The fraternity's colors are Purple and White. The fraternity flower is the camellia and the fraternity jewel is the amethyst. The badge of the fraternity is a gold rhombus (diamond) with blue enamel. Engraved upon the badge in gold are a Greek lamp at the apex, crossed scimitars in the middle and, at the bottom, the Greek letters ΦΚ. The crossed scimitars are a well-known symbol of the fraternity. The foundational principles of the fraternity are Brotherhood, Faith in God, Scholarship, and Community Service.

Famous alumni of Phi Kappa include astronaut Fred Haise, Jr. (T), who served as the Lunar Module Pilot on the Apollo 13 mission, John Alexander (ΔΧ), a leading tenor at the Metropolitan Opera for over four decades, Gilbert Carmichael (ΔΧ), former Federal Railroad Administrator and current Senior Chairman of the Intermodal Transportation Institute at University of Denver, Dr. Jerome V. Reel, Jr. (ΑΩ) who currently serves as Senior Vice Provost and Dean of Undergraduate Studies at Clemson University and U.S. Congressman Steven Palazzo (ΘΓ), current Representative for Mississippi's 4th Congressional District. Two governors of Mississippi (Thomas L. Bailey, who served from 1943–46 and Fielding L. Wright, who served from 1946–52) served as adult sponsors (i.e. "chapter fathers") of local Phi Kappa chapters. As a high school student at the Lamar School in Meridian, Mississippi, actress Sela Ward was an honoree (or "little sister") for the Delta Chi chapter of Phi Kappa.

History
Phi Kappa's founding is shrouded in mystery. Though tradition records a founding date of February 3, 1900 for the fraternity, if this is accurate, Phi Kappa must have remained strictly subrosa at the institution of its birth, the Southern University Preparatory School in Greensboro, Alabama, for at least fifteen years. No names or other information are known about this supposed turn-of-the-century founding, a fact which may well be due to the secretive nature of the Alpha Chapter. On the other hand, some fraternity historians have surmised that the date may have been arbitrarily chosen by the fraternity at a later date and that the true foundation of Phi Kappa is tied to the young man that has been honored from at least the 1920s, as her "founder." That young man's name was Jacob Broughton Nelson. While it is known that he was connected to the fraternity's first known expansion in 1919, Nelson may actually be rightly honored with the title "founder" for from all recorded memories, nothing was known of Phi Kappa before Nelson emerged into history as its first "Grand Master" in the spring of 1919. It is doubtful that the truth about the founding of Phi Kappa will ever be known with certainty because death has silenced the earliest witnesses to the Order's genesis. But whether the fraternity was founded by unknown persons in 1900 or was actually begun in 1919 by Nelson himself, it was under the leadership and initiative of Jacob Broughton Nelson that the fraternity began earnest expansion, enabling thousands of young men throughout the South to experience the benefits of membership in Phi Kappa.

"Broughton" Nelson (as he was known to friends and family members), the man Phi Kappas called founder, was a tragic and mysterious figure who appeared suddenly, rising like a blazing star in Phi Kappa's early years and then, just as suddenly, vanished into mystery and fraternity lore. The known facts regarding Broughton Nelson are few but they paint a fascinating picture of a young man accustomed to hardship. Nelson was born on July 31, 1898 in Brundidge, Alabama. Unknown circumstances in Broughton's infancy caused him to be adopted by his birth mother's half-sister and her husband. He was raised by his aunt and uncle, Laura Locke and Rev. Jacob Boone Nelson respectively. Rev. Jacob Boone Nelson was a circuit minister for the Methodist Episcopal Church, South in southern Alabama. In 1915, Broughton enrolled as a student at Southern University (Southern), a Methodist institution in Greensboro, Alabama. From all accounts, Broughton was a likable and popular fellow at Southern.

The death of Broughton's uncle and adoptive father, Jacob Boone Nelson, in 1916 most likely cut short Broughton's tenure at Southern. He moved back home to live with his adoptive (and now widowed) mother in Troy, Alabama. In the summer of 1917, Broughton's friend and roommate from Southern, Jack Oscar Hain, visited him in Troy and found that Broughton had established a second chapter of Phi Kappa—Upsilon (Υ)--in that town. The Upsilon chapter was very popular in Troy. It had its own chapter room above Lorch's Jewelry store on the Troy town square and competed for members with the Jaguar Club, another social club in town. That summer, during his visit, Hain was initiated into the Upsilon chapter of Phi Kappa.

The following fall, Hain enrolled in the Gulf Coast Military Academy (GCMA) in Gulfport, Mississippi. Also attending GCMA in the fall of 1917 were three other members of Troy's Upsilon Chapter: Clarence Heath Cowart, William F. Palmer and F. Joseph Hendley. Though invited to join other fraternities already on campus, the four, in loyalty to their fraternity, decided to form their own chapter of Phi Kappa at GCMA. With Broughton Nelson's assistance, the chapter was chartered as Mu Theta (ΜΘ), two letters which would come to symbolize for the fraternity utmost dedication to Phi Kappa and her ideals. Around the same time, a fourth chapter—Gamma Beta (ΓΒ)--was chartered at the newly created Emory University Academy in Oxford, Georgia. During this earliest period of expansion, there was a trend to name the chapters outside of Phi Kappa's home state of Alabama with a Greek letter corresponding to the new chapter's state. So, while the first two chapters (both founded inside Alabama) retained single-letter chapter names (Alpha at Southern and Upsilon at Troy), Phi Kappa's third chapter chose the name Mu Theta (Mu standing for Mississippi) while the fourth chapter bore the name Gamma Beta, with Gamma standing for Georgia. This early pattern of chapter designation was soon abandoned.

Only twenty years after her birth, Phi Kappa lost the young man who had led her out of obscurity, into two neighboring states and, in so doing, who set the stage for unprecedented growth of Phi Kappa's ideals across the South. Around 1921, Broughton Nelson left his family and friends in Troy and never returned. Neither family nor friends ever saw Broughton again. The circumstances surrounding Broughton Nelson's disappearance in 1921 are as mysterious as those surrounding the birth of the fraternity which honors him as founder. It seems as though Nelson left Troy sometime after 1920 for he appears in the 1920 federal census as a resident of Troy. At that point, facts end and speculation begins.

It has been reported that Brougton died as a victim of tuberculosis in Colorado but this claim has not been verified. It was also reported that he simply moved to Texas around 1920. But the fact is that no one has come across any records of Jacob Broughton Nelson after 1920. Regardless of whether he died or disappeared, no one in Troy or in any Phi Kappa chapter, friend or family, ever saw or heard from Broughton Nelson again after 1920. His sudden and unexplained absence brought a hard blow to the Phi Kappa he knew so well.
 
Troy's Upsilon chapter disintegrated after Broughton's disappearance. The Alpha chapter had been forced to fold in 1918 when the Southern University Preparatory School was closed. Emory University Academy's Gamma Beta chapter, though reportedly a strong link in Phi Kappa's chain, was geographically isolated and finally succumbed to the pressure of an anti-fraternity administration in 1924. If it were not for Mu Theta's strength during this time in the fraternity's history, Phi Kappa probably would not have survived. While the other chapters were dying or being forced to die, Mu Theta was building and growing and was willing and able to take the leadership position in the Fraternity and at Gulf Coast Military Academy. As the members of Mu Theta fanned out across the South each summer break, many returned to their hometowns and founded Phi Kappa chapters. Through these actions, Mu Theta earned the moniker within Phi Kappa of "Mother Mu Theta," because it was from this one chapter that all subsequent chapters of Phi Kappa were born. When Phi Kappa's coat-of-arms was adopted, it incorporated the Greek letters Mu Theta in one quadrant of the shield to recognize the important role in the fraternity's survival played by the chapter at Gulf Coast Military Academy.

In a far-reaching effort to protect Phi Kappa from growing anti-fraternity sentiment, the fraternity was incorporated in the state of Delaware in 1943 under the guidance of alumnus Guy D. Campbell (Δ), a former Exalted Grand Master (national president) who would later earn national recognition for his contributions to the field of medical research. It is likely that the fraternity was incorporated as "Phi Kappa National Fraternity" instead of simply as "Phi Kappa Fraternity" because in 1943 there was already a well-established and well-known college fraternity called Phi Kappa. The identifying term "national" was most likely added in Phi Kappa's incorporation application to distinguish the secondary fraternity from the college fraternity to which she was linked in name only.

Past National Presidents

1917-1919 Jacob Broughten Nelson - Alpha & Upsilon (Southern Prep & Troy, AL)
1919-1921 Clarence Heath Cowart - Upsilon & Mu Theta (Troy, AL & GCMA)
1921-1922 H. Jamin Gordon - Mu Theta (GCMA)
1922-1923 Jeff D. Upshaw - Mu Theta (GCMA)
1923-1924 James G. Scott - Mu Theta (GCMA)
1927-1929 James T. Overby - Lambda (Mobile)
1929-1931 Sydney L. Hargrove - Lambda (Mobile)
1931-1932 Merrill P. McDougall - Beta (Memphis)
1932-1933 C. Richard Calhoun - Beta (Memphis)
1933-1935 James S. Poole - Sigma (Jackson, MS)
1935-1936 Hunter Harmon - Delta Chi (Meridian, MS)
1936-1937 William Haynes - Eta (Monroe, LA)
1937-1938 N.D. Sappenfield, Jr. - Beta (Memphis)
1938-1939 Lee Harris - Delta Chi (Meridian, MS)
1939-1940 Edward Gillian - Theta (Hattiesburg, MS)
1940-1941 John Low - Delta (Laurel, MS)
1941-1942 Charles Bishop - Alpha Beta (Jackson, MS)
1942-1943 Henry Spurrier - Beta (Memphis) 
1943-1944 William Armstrong - Eta (Monroe, LA)
1944 Scott Kelso - Delta (Laurel, MS)
1944-1945 Bill Daniels - Lambda (Mobile)
1945-1946 Guy D. Campbell - Delta (Laurel, MS)
1946-1947 Gerald Lacey - Tau & Chi (Biloxi & New Orleans)
1947-1949 Clyde T. Turner - Alpha Beta (Jackson, MS)
1949-1950 William Crawford - Lambda (Mobile)
1950-1951 Frank Liddell - Beta (Memphis)
1951-1952 Donald Flukinger - Lambda (Mobile)
1952-1953 Malcolm English - Theta (Hattiesburg, MS)
1953-1954 Ronald Weinberg - Tau (Biloxi)
1954-1955 William Wheelis - Eta (Monroe, LA)
1955-1956 William Long - Lambda (Mobile)
1956-1960 Jerome V. Reel, Jr. - Alpha Omega (New Orleans)
1960-1962 Reese T. Bowen, Jr. - Delta (Laurel, MS)
1962-1963 Howard Wallace - Delta (Laurel, MS)
1963-1966 Albert S. Cain, III - Alpha Omega (New Orleans)
1966-1967 Jerry Rigdon - Delta Chi (Meridian, MS)
1967-1968 Michael E. Ellis - Delta (Laurel, MS)
1968-1970 W. Richard Pryor - Delta (Laurel, MS)
1970-1972 Robert Livingston Pugh - Beta (Memphis)
1972-1974 Richard Chenoweth - Delta Pi (Pascagoula, MS)
1974-1976 Michael Newfield - Alpha Iota (Covington, LA)
1976-1978 Stephan M. Nelson - Theta Gamma (Gulfport, MS)
1978-1980 Roger Ishee - Theta Gamma (Gulfport, MS)
1980-1982 Greg Carney - Theta Gamma (Gulfport, MS)
1982-1983 Robby Boyd - Sigma Gamma (Bay Saint Louis, MS)
1983-1984 Bob Coffin - Delta (Laurel, MS)
1982-1984 Jose Beaton - Theta (Hattiesburg, MS)
1986-1988 Tim Farris - Theta (Hattiesburg, MS)
1988-1990 Jamie Schlottman - Theta (Hattiesburg, MS)
1990-1992 Steven Palazzo - Theta Gamma (Gulfport, MS)
1992-1994 Russ Carothers - Theta Gamma (Gulfport, MS)
1994-1996 Scott Glorioso - Delta (Laurel, MS)
1996-1998 Ryan Cooper - Delta (Laurel, MS)
1998-2000 David Maxie - Theta Gamma (Gulfport, MS)
2000-2004 Gerald Everett - Tau (Biloxi)
2004-2005 Mark Turnage - Omega (Columbia, MS)
2005-2007 Matthew Carwright - Gamma Tau (St. Martin, MS)
 2013-2014 Tucker McGill- Lambda (Mobile, AL)
 2014-2015 Dylan Hooper - Lambda ( Mobile, AL) 
 2015-2016 historic tri president year. John P. Vallas, Henry Mann and Samuel Feibelman- Lambda (Mobile, AL)
2016-2017 William Mote- Lambda (Mobile, Al)

Structure and organization

Most Phi Kappa chapters are chartered in a city or town and are not related to or even officially recognized by the high schools (public or private) from which their members are drawn (although some of Phi Kappa's earliest chapters were exceptions to this rule). Even without official recognition by local school officials (and, in many instances, in the face of blatant anti-fraternity policies), many local chapters demonstrated uncommon resilience and longevity in some Southern communities, with membership in Phi Kappa becoming a proud family tradition for high school students in many cities across the Deep South.

Much like a college fraternity, prospective members of Phi Kappa are chosen by the active membership of the local chapter and are extended a bid to pledge the fraternity. The pledging period usually lasts around one academic semester. During this period, pledges learn about the fraternity and become better acquainted with the active members. The importance of academics is stressed and pledges are expected to maintain a certain level of academic achievement during the pledge period. Hazing (physical, psychological or otherwise) of pledges is strictly forbidden by the fraternity. After completion of the pledge period, the new members are initiated into the fraternity and, at that point, become full and equal members of Phi Kappa.

Local chapters are run by officers elected from the chapter's high school-aged membership. The officers include a Grand Master (president), Worthy Master (vice president), Scribe (secretary), Treasurer, Pledge Master (pledge trainer) and a Sergeant-at-Arms who keeps order at meetings. Other officers may be elected and/or appointed as needed. Weekly chapter meetings are usually rotated between the homes of members, though some chapters maintain a permanent meeting space. Regular and punctual attendance at chapter meetings (much like their college fraternity counterparts) is considered mandatory. The Phi Kappa members plan and coordinate their own activities with community service projects and social activities making up a large part of the typical chapter calendar.

Each chapter has at least one adult sponsor (usually known as the "chapter parent" with most chapters having a "chapter mom" and a "chapter dad") and each elects at least one female honoree (or "little sister") from each grade at a local high school. One senior honoree is chosen as the chapter "Sweetheart." Little Sisters the Sweetheart attend the weekly chapter meetings and help the chapter to plan and execute social and charitable functions but they are not initiated into the fraternity.

National organization

Phi Kappa is led, on the national level, by alumni members who make up a governing body known as the Executive Council (EC). Some of the Executive Council officers are elected by delegates of the fraternity who attend Phi Kappa's annual national Convention. Other positions on the EC are appointed by the elected EC members. Besides the yearly national convention, the fraternity also hosts another annual, national gathering called Conclave. Grand Masters' Retreat (begun in 1960) is held annually to sharpen leadership skills and social ties between the officers of the various chapters. Founder's Day (begun in 1980 and held on or near Jacob Brougton Nelson's birthday of July 31) is recognized locally each year by the chapters, as is Community Service Project Day where all of the fraternity's chapters work in conjunction to assist a worthy cause. National publications include The Scimitar (a national yearbook), The Herald (the national newsletter), and The Key (which publishes necessary secret information for the fraternity, as needed). The pledge manual is called The Nelson Dream.

Although Phi Kappa had chartered nearly fifty chapters and had initiated more than 10,000 young men throughout the years, only ten of these chapters survived into the third millennium. Unfortunately, many of these chapters were severely weakened by a few high profile, yet isolated, instances of carelessness and ungentlemanlike conduct at national events. By 2005, the fraternity shrunk to encompass only a handful of chapters in a few southern Mississippi cities. The fraternity's oldest chapter, Lambda (Λ), was chartered in Mobile, Alabama in 1923.

In 2007, a concerted effort at re-organizing and expanding the national fraternity was begun. The Alpha Omega (ΑΩ) chapter in New Orleans was re-chartered with four young men leading the chapter. Although best efforts were put forth by the chapter to colonize, due to public disinterest the chapter failed to gain any new members before the chapter was forced to disband in 2009.

The devastation wrought by Hurricane Katrina in 2005 was concentrated on the Mississippi Gulf Coast (where all but one of the remaining Phi Kappa chapters were located). The unprecedented circumstances brought about by this storm ravaged lives and destroyed infrastructure and communication along the Gulf Coast. In the aftermath of the storm, many schools were forced to close temporarily and many students evacuated the area, disrupting the lives of nearly all Coast residents. Phi Kappa was not immune to the hurricane's lasting effects these circumstances contributed to a severe weakening of the fraternity. The disaster forced the remaining coastal chapters of the fraternity into long periods of inactivity from which it has been difficult to recover. Sadly, many national records, archives and irreplaceable historical memorabilia of the fraternity were lost in the storm's ravages. The buildings of the former Gulf Coast Military Academy in Gulfport, Mississippi were also heavily damaged - likely beyond repair.

Chapter roll

The following is a listing of all officially chartered chapters of Phi Kappa National Fraternity. The chapter name is followed by the location of the chapter and the date that the chapter was founded. If known, the date the chapter's charter was revoked is included as well. Currently active chapters are italicized.

Alpha (A)
Southern University Preparatory School, Greensboro, Ala. 
1900(?)-1918
 
Upsilon
Troy, Ala.
1916-1918
 
Gamma Beta
Emory University Academy, Oxford, Ga. 
1917-1924
 
Mu Theta
Gulf Coast Military Academy, Gulfport, Miss.
1918-1951
 
Beta
Memphis, Tenn.
Oct 15, 1922
 
LambdaMobile, Ala.
Oct 10, 1923 †
 
Delta
Laurel, Miss.
1924, Reinstalled July 26, 1930 – 2003
 
Epsilon                 
Birmingham, Ala.
1925-1929, Reinstalled 1966-1971
 
Eta
Monroe, La.
June 17, 1927
 
Theta
Hattiesburg, Miss.
July 17, 1927
 
Zeta (Z)
Jackson, Tenn.
1927-1941
 
Delta Chi
Meridian, Miss.
1928-1946, Reinstalled Oct 26, 1958
 
Kappa (K)
Alexandria, La.
1929-1933
 
Alpha Eta (AH)
Minden, La.
1932-1938
 
Gamma
Jackson, Miss.
1932-1932

Sigma            
El Paso, Tx.
1932-1942
 
Alpha Beta (AB)       
Jackson, Miss.
1939-1949
 
Tau (T)
Biloxi, Miss.
Dec 17, 1939
 
Chi (X)
New Orleans, La.
1943-1947
 
Omega            
Columbia, Miss.
Oct 24, 1943 
rechartered in 2015

 
Kappa Alpha (KA)
Bastrop, La.
1944-1950
 Alpha Omega''
New Orleans, La.
Dec 14, 1947, Reinstalled May 1, 1953, Reinstalled Dec 1, 2007 (Disbanded in 2009)
 
Zeta (Z)
Marion, Ark.
Sept 9, 1954
 
Theta Sigma
Pensacola, Fla.
1955-1971
 
Iota (I)
Wiggins, Miss. 
1958-1960

Delta Omega
Lafayette, LA.
1963-1965
 
Alpha Iota (AI)
Covington, La.  
July 2, 1967
 
Chi Omega
Jackson, Tenn. 
Feb 10, 1968
 
Sigma Tau
Oxford, Miss.
Feb 10, 1968, Reinstalled Feb 22, 1992
 
Theta Gamma
Gulfport, Miss.
June 16, 1968
 
Delta Pi
Pascagoula, Miss.  
1968-1990
 
Theta Chi
Natchez, Miss.
1969-1971
 
Xi
Paragould, Ark.
Feb 8, 1969
 
Phi Tau
Tylertown, Miss.
Feb 8, 1969
 
Zeta Chi (ZX)
Lubbock, Tx.
June 13, 1971
 
Beta Delta      
Huntsville, Ala.
Feb 13, 1972
 
Delta Gamma
Long Beach, Miss.
Feb 9, 1974

Sigma Gamma
Bay St. Louis, Miss.
June, 1979
 
Delta Sigma
Vicksburg, Miss.
June, 1982

Theta Chi
Collins, Miss.
June, 1984

Nu Gamma
Ocean Springs, Miss.
June 15, 1985
 
Tau Gamma
Biloxi, Miss.
June, 1987, Reverted to original Biloxi chapter name, Tau (T), in 1995
 
Delta Nu          
McComb, Miss.
June 16, 1990
 
Zeta Gamma
Bay St. Louis, Miss.
1991-1992
 
Delta Omicron  
Waynesboro, Miss.
1991

Omega Tau 
St. Martin, Miss.
1997

Gamma Tau
Gautier, Miss.
1999

Phi Kappa
Mobile, Ala.
1990

†- This chapter has been unaffiliated with the national fraternity since the mid-1980s, but is still active as a local fraternity in the city.

High school fraternities and sororities
Fraternities and sororities in the United States
Student organizations established in 1900
1900 establishments in Alabama